The Nagorno-Karabakh conflict is an ethnic and territorial conflict between Armenia and Azerbaijan over the disputed region of Nagorno-Karabakh, inhabited mostly by ethnic Armenians, and seven surrounding districts, inhabited mostly by Azerbaijanis until their expulsion during the 1990s during a period of Armenian occupation. The Nagorno-Karabakh region is entirely claimed by and partially de facto controlled by the breakaway Republic of Artsakh, but is recognized internationally as part of Azerbaijan. Azerbaijan controls the remainder of the Nagorno-Karabakh region (from which the Armenian population was expelled during the 2020s) as well as the seven surrounding districts. 

The conflict has its origins in the early 20th century, but the present conflict began in 1988, when the Karabakh Armenians demanded the transfer of Karabakh, a region in the southern Caucasus, from Soviet Azerbaijan to Soviet Armenia. The conflict escalated into a full-scale war in the early 1990s following the dissolution of the Soviet Union. The First Nagorno-Karabakh War led to tens of thousands of casualties. The war was won by Armenia, which subsequently occupied large parts of southwestern Azerbaijan, beyond the borders of the unrecognized Republic of Artsakh. Many ethnic Azerbaijanis were expelled from the Armenian-occupied areas, while ethnic Armenians were expelled from Azerbaijan. The ceasefire ending the first war, signed in 1994 in Bishkek, was followed by two decades of relative stability, which significantly deteriorated in the 2010s. A four-day escalation in April 2016 resulted in hundreds of casualties but only minor changes to the frontline. In late 2020, the large-scale Second Nagorno-Karabakh War resulted in thousands of casualties and a significant Azerbaijani victory. A tentative armistice was established by a tripartite ceasefire agreement on November 10, resulting in most of the territories lost by Azerbaijan during the first war returning to Azerbaijani control. Incidents in Nagorno-Karabakh and on the Armenian-Azerbaijani border continued following the second war, with intermittent but ongoing casualties.

Background

Following the breakup of the Russian Empire, the Armenians of Nagorno-Karabakh formed an unrecognised polity known as the Karabakh Council in 1918. Due to Azerbaijani–British pressure, the Karabakh Council in August 1919 was forced to provisionally recognise the authority of Azerbaijan pending the Paris Peace Conference's decision on the South Caucasus republics' international borders. As the peace conference was inconclusive regarding Nagorno-Karabakh, the Azerbaijani governor-general Khosrov bey Sultanov, issued an ultimatum to the Armenians of Karabakh in early 1920, stipulating their acceptance of permanent inclusion into Azerbaijan. Armenia responded by dispatching its agents to organize a rebellion in Nagorno-Karabakh against Azerbaijani rule—the subversive preparations culminated in an abortive uprising that led to the massacre and displacement of Shusha's Armenian population. By 1921, Nagorno-Karabakh was in the control of Soviet authorities who decided on the formation of the Nagorno-Karabakh Autonomous Oblast (NKAO) within Soviet Azerbaijan.

In 1964, the Armenians of Karabakh sent a letter to leader of the USSR, Nikita Khrushchev, complaining about the economic management of the NKAO and asking for their region and "all adjacent Armenian regions" to be joined to the Armenian SSR, "or to make them [a part of the] RSFSR." The conflict continued to simmer under the surface until Mikhail Gorbachev's reforms.

Amid the gradual dissolution of the Soviet Union in 1988–89, ethnic tensions between Armenians and Azerbaijanis exploded in the Nagorno-Karabakh region. According to the 1979 Soviet census, 160,841 Azeris lived in Armenia and 352,410 Armenians lived in Azerbaijan outside of Nagorno-Karabakh. The 1989 Soviet census showed a decline of those minorities to 84,860 Azeris in Armenia and 245,045 Armenians in Azerbaijan outside of Nagorno-Karabakh. De Waal writes that in the mid-1980s, there were approximately 350,000 Armenians in Azerbaijan outside of Nagorno-Karabakh, and 200,000 Azerbaijanis in Armenia.

According to Stuart Kaufman, a professor of political science and international relations, and Thomas de Waal, the first instance of violence in the conflict occurred in October 1987 when an Azerbaijani official "punished" the Armenian-populated village of Chardakhly (present-day Çardaqlı) with a raid for protesting against the appointment of a new collective-farm director. During the raid, the village's women, children, and elderly were beaten up. In his 2003 book Black Garden, Thomas de Waal speculated that "[p]ossibly in reaction to such incidents", Azerbaijanis in Armenia (specifically in the districts of Ghapan and Meghri) were in November 1987 driven out of their homes, arriving at Baku in two freight cars. A number of Armenian scholars and investigative journalists, however, have scrutinized these alleged incidents and argued that, outside the claims made by Azerbaijani officials, there is no evidence, archival or otherwise, to corroborate such instances of mass violence taking place, at least prior to February 1988.

Timeline

First Nagorno-Karabakh War (1988–1994)

The First Nagorno-Karabakh War, also known as the Artsakh Liberation War in Armenia and Nagorno-Karabakh, was an armed conflict that took place in the late 1980s to May 1994, in the enclave of Nagorno-Karabakh in southwestern Azerbaijan, between the majority ethnic Armenians of Nagorno-Karabakh backed by the Republic of Armenia, and the Republic of Azerbaijan. As the war progressed, Armenia and Azerbaijan, both former Soviet Republics, entangled themselves in a protracted, undeclared war in the mountainous heights of Karabakh as Azerbaijan attempted to curb the secessionist movement in Nagorno-Karabakh.

The enclave's parliament had voted in favor of uniting with Armenia. A referendum, boycotted by the Azerbaijani population of Nagorno-Karabakh, was held, whereby most of the voters voted in favor of independence. The demand to unify with Armenia, which began anew in 1988, began in a relatively peaceful manner. As the Soviet Union's dissolution neared, the tensions gradually grew into an increasingly violent conflict between ethnic Armenians and ethnic Azerbaijanis. Both sides made claims of ethnic cleansing and pogroms conducted by the other.

Inter-ethnic clashes between the two broke out shortly after the parliament of the Nagorno-Karabakh Autonomous Oblast in Azerbaijan voted to unify the region with Armenia on 20 February 1988. The circumstances of the dissolution of the Soviet Union facilitated an Armenian separatist movement in Soviet Azerbaijan. The declaration of secession from Azerbaijan was the final result of a territorial conflict regarding the land. As Azerbaijan declared its independence from the Soviet Union and removed the powers held by the enclave's government, the Armenian majority voted to secede from Azerbaijan. In the process they proclaimed the unrecognized Republic of Nagorno-Karabakh.

Full-scale fighting erupted in the late winter of 1992. International mediation by several groups, including the Organization for Security and Co-operation in Europe (OSCE), failed to bring resolution. In the spring of 1993, Armenian forces captured territory outside the enclave itself, threatening to catalyze the involvement of other countries in the region. By the end of the war in 1994, the Armenians were in full control of most of the enclave and also held and currently control approximately 9% of Azerbaijan's territory outside the enclave. As many as 230,000 Armenians from Azerbaijan and 800,000 Azerbaijanis from Armenia and Karabakh have been displaced as a result of the conflict, essentially cleansing Armenia and Karabakh from Azerbaijanis and Azerbaijan of Armenians. A Russian-brokered ceasefire was signed in May 1994, leading to diplomatic mediation.

Border clashes (2008–2020)

The 2008 Mardakert clashes began on 4 March after the 2008 Armenian election protests, resulting in several score wounded and killed, with both sides declaring victory. It was the heaviest fighting between ethnic Armenian and Azerbaijani forces since the 1994 ceasefire after the First Nagorno-Karabakh War. Following the incident, on March 14 the United Nations General Assembly by a recorded vote of 39 in favour to 7 against adopted Resolution 62/243, demanding the immediate withdrawal of all Armenian forces from the occupied territories of Azerbaijan. The 2010 Nagorno-Karabakh clash was a scattered exchange of gunfire that took place on February 18 on the line of contact dividing Azerbaijani and the Karabakh Armenian military forces. As a result, three Azerbaijani soldiers were killed and one wounded. The 2010 Mardakert clashes were the deadliest for Armenian forces since the 2008 violence. Between 2008 and 2010, 74 soldiers were killed on both sides.

In late April 2011, border clashes left three Nagorno-Karabakh soldiers dead, while on 5 October, two Azerbaijani and one Armenian soldier were killed. In all during the year, 10 Armenian soldiers were killed. The following year, continued border clashes between the armed forces of Armenia and Azerbaijan took place from late April through early June. The clashes resulted in the deaths of five Azerbaijani and four Armenian soldiers. In all during 2012, 19 Azerbaijani and 14 Armenian soldiers were killed. Another report put the number of Azerbaijani dead at 20. Throughout 2013, 12 Azerbaijani and 7 Armenian soldiers were killed in border clashes.

In 2014, several border clashes erupted. By August, 27 Azerbaijani soldiers had died since the start of the year. On November 12, 2014, the Azerbaijani armed forces shot down a Nagorno-Karabakh Defense Army Mil Mi-24 helicopter over Karabakh's Agdam district. With the crash, 2014 became the deadliest year for Armenian forces since the 1994 ceasefire agreement, with 27 soldiers killed. Six Armenian civilians also died in 2014, while by the end of the year the number of Azerbaijanis killed rose to 39 (37 soldiers and 2 civilians). In 2015, 42 Armenian soldiers and 5 civilians were killed as border clashes continued. In addition, at least 64 Azerbaijani soldiers also died, according to Armenian sources.

Over the years, Azerbaijan had been growing impatient with the status quo. In this regard, propelled by oil and gas windfall, the country embarked in a military build-up. In 2015 alone, Baku spent USD $3 billion on its military, more than Armenia's entire national budget. 

In early 2016, the most serious clashes until the 2020 war occurred (the 2016 Nagorno-Karabakh conflict). Between 1 and 5 April 2016, heavy fighting along the Nagorno-Karabakh frontline left 88 Armenian and 31–92 Azerbaijani soldiers dead. One Armenian and three Azerbaijani soldiers were also missing. In addition, 10 civilians (six Azerbaijani and four Armenian) were also killed. During the clashes, an Azerbaijani military helicopter and 13 unmanned drones were shot down and an Azerbaijani tank was destroyed, while Nagorno-Karabakh lost 14 tanks.

Continued clashes occurred in 2018. Three civilian volunteers were killed in a demining operation in Nagorno-Karabakh on 29 March 2018. 2020 saw a number of clashes, particularly heavy in July (July 2020 Armenian–Azerbaijani clashes).

Second Nagorno-Karabakh War (2020) 

Large-scale fighting began on the morning of 27 September, with an Azerbaijani offensive along the line of contact established in the aftermath of the first war. Clashes were particularly intense in the less mountainous districts of southern Nagorno-Karabakh. On the same day, Azerbaijan's Parliament declared a martial law and established curfews in several cities and regions following the clashes. Turkey provided military support to Azerbaijan, although the extent of this support has been disputed.

The war was marked by the deployment of drones, sensors, long-range heavy artillery and missile strikes, as well as by state propaganda and the use of official social media accounts in online information warfare. In particular, Azerbaijan's widespread use of drones was seen as crucial in determining the conflict's outcome. Numerous countries and the United Nations strongly condemned the fighting and called on both sides to de-escalate tensions and resume meaningful negotiations. Three ceasefires brokered by Russia, France, and the United States failed to stop the conflict.

Following the capture of Shusha, the second-largest city in Nagorno-Karabakh, a ceasefire agreement was signed, ending all hostilities in the area from 10 November 2020. Under the agreement, the warring sides kept control of the areas they held within Nagorno-Karabakh at the time of the ceasefire, Armenia returned the surrounding territories it had occupied since 1994 to Azerbaijan, and Azerbaijan was guaranteed transport communication to its exclave Nakhchivan, bordering Turkey and Iran. Approximately 2,000 Russian soldiers were deployed as peacekeeping forces along the Lachin corridor connecting Armenia and Nagorno-Karabakh, with a mandate of at least five years. Following the end of the war, an unconfirmed number of Armenian prisoners of war were captive in Azerbaijan, with reports of mistreatment and charges filed against them, leading to a case at the International Court of Justice.

Casualties were high, officially in the low thousands. According to official figures released by the belligerents, Armenia and Artsakh lost 3,825 troops, with 187 servicemen missing in action, while Azerbaijan claimed 2,906 of their troops were killed, with 6 missing in action. The Syrian Observatory for Human Rights reported the deaths of 541 Syrian fighters or mercenaries fighting for Azerbaijan. However, it was noted that the sides downplayed the number of their own casualties and exaggerated the numbers of enemy casualties and injuries.

The total number of reported civilian fatalities on both sides was at least 185; the whereabouts of 21 Armenian civilians remain unknown. Civilian areas, including major cities, were hit, particularly Stepanakert, Martuni, Martakert, Shushi in the Republic of Artsakh and Ganja, Barda and Tartar in Azerbaijan, with many buildings and homes destroyed.

Border crisis (2021–present) 

Azerbaijan has not withdrawn its troops from internationally recognised Armenian territory despite calls to do so by European Parliament, United States and France – two of the three co-chairs of the OSCE Minsk Group.

The crisis further escalated in July 2021, with clashes taking place on the Armenia–Nakhchivan border. The clashes then spread to the Gegharkunik–Kalbajar area, with casualties being reported from both sides. Joint statement on 17 November 2021 by the Chair of the Delegation for relations with the South Caucasus, Marina Kaljurand, the European Parliament's Standing Rapporteur on Armenia Andrey Kovatchev and the European Parliament's Standing Rapporteur on Azerbaijan, Željana Zovko called the military operation launched by Azerbaijan on 16 November 2021 the worst violation to-date since the 2020 ceasefire agreement.

Renewed clashes in August 2022 resulted in three people being killed, with Russia accusing Azerbaijan of breaking the ceasefire. On the morning of 13 September 2022, large-scale clashes erupted between Azerbaijani and Armenian troops. The Armenian Defense Ministry said Azerbaijan had attacked Armenian positions near the cities of Vardenis, Goris, Sotk and Jermuk with artillery and heavy weapons. The Azerbaijani Defence Ministry said that Armenia had staged a "large-scale provocations" near the Dashkasan, Kalbajar, and Lachin regions. At least 49 Armenian soldiers and 50 Azeri military personnel were killed.

Blockade of Artsakh (2022-present) 

On 12 December 2022, citizens of Azerbaijan claiming to be "eco-activists" launched a blockade of the Lachin corridor (precisely the Shusha–Dashalty intersection, patrolled by Russian peacekeepers), the only road connecting Artsakh to the outside world and to Armenia. Despite the claims of peaceful intentions, the blockade has had devastating consequences for the people of Artsakh, preventing the importation of food, fuel, and medicine into Artsakh. Shortages are widespread, and emergency reserves are being rationed. In the first days of the blockade (between 13 and 16 December), Azerbaijan cut off the gas supply to Artsakh.

It is widely believed that the blockade has been orchestrated by the Azerbaijani government as a form of hybrid warfare in its quest to subdue and eventually annex Artsakh. Many countries, international organizations, and political analysts have condemned the blockade and scrutinised the legitimacy of the eco-activism claims. The individuals involved in the blockade have little to no record of eco-activism, work for Azerbaijani state organs, are sponsored by the government, and display nationalist symbols and slogans (some of which are from the Grey Wolves). Critics have also pointed out that freedom of assembly is not a right normally exercised freely in Azerbaijan. The individuals involved in the blockade have demanded that Azerbaijan establish state control over the Lachin corridor.

Fatalities

1988–1994
An estimated 28,000–38,000 people were killed between 1988 and 1994.

Armenian military fatalities were reported to be between 5,856 and 6,000, while 1,264 Armenian civilians were also killed. Another 196 Armenian soldiers and 400 civilians were missing. According to the Union of Relatives of the Artsakh War Missing in Action Soldiers, as of 2014, 239 Karabakhi soldiers remain officially unaccounted for.

Azerbaijan stated 11,557 of its soldiers were killed, while Western and Russian estimates of dead combatants on the Azerbaijani side were 25,000–30,000. 4,210 Azerbaijani soldiers and 749 civilians were also missing. The total number of Azerbaijani civilians killed in the conflict is unknown, although 167–763 were killed on one day in 1992 by the Republic of Nagorno-Karabakh's forces.

1994–2019
Although no precise casualty figures exist, between 1994 and 2009, as many as 3,000 people, mostly soldiers, had been killed, according to most observers. In 2008, the fighting became more intense and frequent. With 72 deaths in 2014, the year became the bloodiest since the war had ended. Two years later, between 1 and 5 April 2016, heavy fighting along the Nagorno-Karabakh front left 91 Armenian (11 non-combat) and 94 Azerbaijani soldiers dead, with two missing. In addition, 15 civilians (nine Armenians and six Azerbaijanis) were killed.

Azerbaijan stated 398 of its soldiers and 31 civilians were killed between 1994 and up to September 2020, right before the start of the 2020 conflict. In comparison, the Caspian Defense Studies Institute NGO reported 1,008 Azerbaijani soldiers and more than 90 civilians were killed between 1994 and 2016.

2020
In the two-month 2020 fighting, thousands were killed, primarily soldiers, but also almost two hundred civilians.

Between January and September 2020, 16 Azerbaijani and 8 Armenian soldiers, as well as an Azerbaijani civilian, were killed in sporadic clashes. On 27 September 2020, a new large-scale war erupted that lasted until 10 November. According to Azerbaijan, the fighting left 2,906 Azerbaijani soldiers and 100 civilians dead, while six servicemen were still missing. Armenian authorities stated the fighting had left 3,825 Armenian soldiers and 85 civilians dead, while 187 servicemen and 21 civilians were still missing. Additionally, the Syrian Observatory for Human Rights documented the deaths of 541 Syrian mercenaries fighting for Azerbaijan. Two Russian soldiers were also killed when their helicopter was shot down by Azerbaijan by accident while flying in Armenian airspace near the border. In addition, a 13-year-old Russian citizen was killed during an Armenian missile strike on the city of Ganja.

Following the end of the war, eleven more Azerbaijani soldiers, six Azerbaijani civilians and one Russian peacekeeper were killed in clashes and landmine explosions in the region by the end of the year.

2021–present
Twelve Azerbaijani civilians and two soldiers were killed in 2021, by landmine explosions. Seventeen Armenian and ten Azerbaijani soldiers were also killed in shoot-outs in the border area, while 38 Armenian soldiers were captured. Twenty-eight of the captured Armenian soldiers were subsequently released.

In 2022, three Armenian soldiers were killed and 14 wounded in an attack by Azerbaijani drones in Nagorno-Karabakh on 25 March.

Foreign involvement

States

Russia

Russia is officially neutral and has sought to play the role of a mediator. In its official statements, Russia calls for a peaceful settlement and restraint during skirmishes. British journalist Thomas de Waal has argued that there is an Azerbaijani narrative that Russia has "consistently supported the Armenian side." According to de Waal, Russia "has more supported the Armenian side," but there have been various "different Russian actors at different times supporting both sides in this conflict." He argues that President Boris Yeltsin did not "want to see the Armenian side be defeated, but he also didn't want to supply them with too many weapons." De Waal concluded in 2012 that "Russia [is] playing both sides", but "ultimately more in the Armenian side." Other commentators have argued that Russia plays both sides in the conflict. Svante Cornell argued in 2018 that Russia "had been playing both sides of the Armenia-Azerbaijan conflict to gain maximum control over both, a policy that continues to this day."

During the war, "Russia was widely viewed as supporting the Armenian position. Much of this perception stemmed from the fact that Russia transferred military support to Armenia." According to Razmik Panossian, Russian forces indirectly supported the Armenian side by "supplying arms, fuel and logistical support." Russia supplied around $1 billion worth of weapons and, thus, "made a vital contribution to the Armenian victory." According to de Waal, "greater Russian support for the Armenians" was one of the main factors behind the Armenian victory. De Waal notes, "Yet it is not entirely clear how this support for the Armenians was translated on to the battlefield; to complicate things further, the Russians also gave some assistance to Azerbaijan."

In the post-war period, Russia is Armenia's main arms supplier and the two countries are military allies. Russia is sometimes described as Armenia's supporter in the conflict, however, this view is widely challenged as Russia extensively sells arms to Azerbaijan. At the same time, Armenia buys Russian weaponry at a discount, while Azerbaijan pays the full price.

Turkey

Turkey is widely considered Azerbaijan's main supporter in the conflict. Svante Cornell wrote in 1998 that Turkey is the "only country that constantly expressed its support for Azerbaijan." It provided Azerbaijan "active military help" during the war. Turkey also supports Azerbaijan diplomatically. Turkish and Azerbaijani armed forces cooperate extensively and regularly hold military exercises. Azerbaijan has also bought weapons from Turkey.

Turkey closed its border with Armenia in April 1993 after Armenian forces captured Kalbajar. Prior to that, the border was only open "on demand and only for transferring the humanitarian aid (mainly wheat delivery) to Armenia and for the operation of the weekly Kars-Gyumri train, which had been crossing the Turkish-Armenian border since the days of the Soviet Union." Turkey has repeatedly refused to normalize and establish diplomatic relations with Armenia in solidarity with Azerbaijan over Karabakh.

Iran
Iran is officially neutral and has sought to play the role of a mediator, most notably in 1992. In its official statements, Iran calls for a peaceful settlement and restraint during skirmishes. At the same time, Iranian officials have repeatedly reaffirmed their support for Azerbaijan's territorial integrity. Deputy Foreign Minister Abbas Araghchi stated in 2020 that "While respecting the territorial integrity of the Azerbaijan Republic, Iran is fundamentally opposed to any move that would fuel conflict between the two neighbouring countries of the Azerbaijan Republic and Armenia."

During the war, "Iran was domestically torn in devising a policy", but de facto "pursued a policy that combined official neutrality with growing support for Armenia," according to Svante Cornell. Cornell argues that Iran has "pursued policies in the conflict inclined towards Armenia." However, Iran's tacit support for the Armenian side was limited to economic cooperation. Terhi Hakala noted in 1998 that "as a geopolitical counter-weight to Turkey, Iran has strongly supported Armenia, especially by alleviating the effects of the Turkish blockade." Cornell notes that during the war, Iran served as Armenia's "main purveyor of electricity and goods, and once the Armenian conquest of Karabakh had been completed, Iranian trucks began to supply most of the secessionist enclave's needs." According to Bahruz Balayev, "Iran supported the territorial integrity of Azerbaijan and gave some humanitarian aid to the [Azerbaijani] refugees, but in the meantime widely cooperates with Armenia and even Karabakh Armenian authorities." Brenda Shaffer wrote that "Iran's cooperation with Armenia and its tacit support in the conflict with Azerbaijan over Karabagh strengthened Yerevan's actual and perceived power and consequently may have lessened its sense of urgency to resolve the conflict."

In 2013, Mohsen Rezaee, who was commander of the Islamic Revolutionary Guard Corps (IRGC) during the war, claimed that he "personally issued an order [...] for the Republic of Azerbaijan army to be equipped appropriately and for it to receive the necessary training." Rezaee added that "Many Iranians died in the Karabakh War. In addition to the wounded, who were transported to [Iran], many of the Iranian martyrs of the Karabakh War are buried in Baku." In 2011, Hassan Ameli, a leading Iranian cleric, claimed that Iran provided Azerbaijan with arms and helped Afghan mujaheddin move to Azerbaijan. The Iranian embassy in Armenia stated that they would not like unreliable information to affect friendly Armenian-Iranian relations: "We do not exclude the possibility that there are forces, which aim to create hindrances for our friendly relations." In October 2020, several protests erupted in Iranian cities, including the capital Tehran and Tabriz, in support of Azerbaijan, with many Iranian Azerbaijanis chanting pro-Azerbaijan slogans and protesting Iran's alleged arms support to Armenia via the Nordooz border crossing.

United States

Thomas Ambrosio suggested in 2000 that the US "supported Azerbaijan's territorial integrity, but enacted policies that effectively supported Armenia's irredentist policies." Sergo Mikoyan argued in 1998 that the US response to the conflict has been "inconsistent, pulled in different directions by the legislative and executive branches of power." Congress was under the influence of the Armenian lobby, while the executive branch (the White House and the State Department) pursued a pro-Azerbaijani policy, which "reflects Turkish influence and the interests of oil companies." Richard C. Longworth and Argam DerHartunian expressed similar views.

Congress's pro-Armenian position was expressed in passing the Section 907 of the Freedom Support Act in 1992, which banned any assistance to Azerbaijan. It was effectively amended by the Senate in 2001 and waived by President George W. Bush starting from 2002. The US provides military aid to both countries. Between 2005 and 2016 Azerbaijan received $8.5 million for counternarcotics assistance and $11.5 million for counterterrorism aid. In the same period, Armenia received only $41,000 for counternarcotics assistance and none for counterterrorism aid. According to EurasiaNet, "Much of the money for Azerbaijan has been targeted toward naval forces, to reduce the risk that it could be used against Armenia." The Trump administration greatly increased the US military aid to Azerbaijan to around $100 million in fiscal years 2018–19, compared to less than $3 million in a year in FY 2016–17. The US aid is primarily "offered in the context of U.S. policy to increase pressure on Iran and focuses on Azerbaijan's Iranian border, but it also has implications for Armenia," according to Emil Sanamyan. In FY 2018, Armenia received $4.2 million in U.S. security assistance.

The US has also provided humanitarian aid to Artsakh (some $36 million between 1998 and 2010), including for demining. The humanitarian aid has been criticized by Azerbaijan for legitimizing the "illegal regime in the occupied lands and damages the reputation of the US as a neutral mediator."

Arms suppliers
In 1992, the Organization for Security and Co-operation in Europe (OSCE) "requested its participating states to impose an embargo on arms deliveries to forces engaged in combat in the Nagorno-Karabakh area." However, it is a "voluntary multilateral arms embargo, and a number of OSCE participating states have supplied arms to Armenia and Azerbaijan since 1992." The UN Security Council Resolution 85, passed in July 1993, called on states to "refrain from the supply of any weapons and munitions which might lead to an intensification of the conflict or the continued occupation of territory." According to SIPRI, "since 2002, the UN Security Council has no longer listed that it is 'actively seized of the matter'. As such, since 2002, it is assumed that the non-mandatory UN embargo is no longer active."

Armenia
Russia has long been Armenia's primary arms supplier. Smaller suppliers include China, India, Ukraine, Greece, Serbia, Jordan (per Armenian MoD sources, denied by Jordan). In March 1992, Yagub Mammadov, chairman of Azerbaijani parliament, accused Syria and Lebanon of supplying weapons to Armenia.

Azerbaijan
According to SIPRI, Russia supplied 55% of Azerbaijan's weaponry in 2007–11, 85% in 2010–14 and 31% in 2015–19. Israel has become a major supplier, accounting for 60% of Azerbaijan's arms imports in 2015–19. Azerbaijan's other suppliers include Turkey, Belarus, Canada (via Turkey), Ukraine, Serbia, and Czech Republic (denied by the Czech authorities).

Foreign fighters
Several foreign groups fought on both sides in the intense period of fighting in 1992–94. According to Human Rights Watch (HRW), both sides used mercenaries during the war, namely "Russian, Ukrainian, and Belorussian mercenaries or rogue units of the Soviet/Russian Army have fought on both sides."

Azerbaijan
Azerbaijan made extensive use of mercenary pilots. According to HRW, "Most informed observers believe that mercenaries pilot most of Azerbaijan's air force."

Several foreign groups fought on the Azerbaijani side: Chechen militants, Afghan mujahideen, members of the Turkish nationalist Grey Wolves, and the Ukrainian nationalist UNA-UNSO. The Chechen fighters in Karabakh were led by Shamil Basayev, who later became Prime Minister of Ichkeria (Chechnya), and Salman Raduyev. Basayev famously participated in the battle of Shusha in 1992. Saudi-born Ibn al-Khattab may have also joined them. The Afghan mujahideen were mostly affiliated with the Hezb-e Islami, led by Afghan Prime Minister Gulbuddin Hekmatyar. According to HRW, they were "clearly not motivated by religious or ideological reasons" and were, thus, mercenaries. The recruitment of Afghan mujahideen, reportedly handled by paramilitary police chief Rovshan Javadov, was denied by Azerbaijani authorities. They first arrived to Azerbaijan in fall 1993 and numbered anywhere between 1,500 and 2,500 or 1,000 and 3,000. Armenia alleged that they were paid for by Saudi Arabia. Afghan mujahideen constituted the most considerable influx of foreign fighters during the war. Some 200 Grey Wolves were still present in the conflict zone as of September 1994 and were engaged in training Azerbaijani units.

Artsakh and Armenia
Some 85 Russian Kuban Cossacks and around 30 Ossetian volunteers fought on the Armenian side. In May 2011, a khachkar was inaugurated in the village of Vank in memory of 14 Kuban Cossacks who died in the war. Ossetian volunteers reportedly came from both South Ossetia (Georgia) and North Ossetia (Russia). No less than 12 diaspora Armenian volunteers fought and four diaspora fighters died in the war. According to David Rieff, members of the Armenian Revolutionary Federation (Dashnaks), "including a substantial number of volunteers from the diaspora, did a great deal of the fighting and dying." Former members of the Armenian Secret Army for the Liberation of Armenia (ASALA) also participated in the war.

Diplomatic support

Artsakh and Armenia
Artsakh (Nagorno-Karabakh Republic) has received diplomatic recognition and diplomatic support, especially during the 2016 clashes, from three partially recognized states: Abkhazia, South Ossetia, and Transnistria.

During the war, Greece adopted a pro-Armenian position and supported it in international forums. During the April 2016 and July 2020 clashes, Cyprus condemned Azerbaijan for violating the ceasefire.

Armenian President Levon Ter-Petrosyan reportedly told the Greek ambassador in 1993 that France and Russia were Armenia's only allies at the time. According to a US State Department cable released in 2020, the French ambassador to the UN, Jean-Bernard Mérimée, succeeded in changing the wording of the UNSC Resolution 822 to state that it was "local Armenian forces", not "Armenian forces" that occupied Kalbajar. He also suggested treating the Armenian capture of Kalbajar not under Chapter VII of the UN Charter (an act of aggression), but Chapter VI (a dispute that should be settled peacefully).

Azerbaijan
Azerbaijan has received explicit diplomatic support in the conflict from several countries and international organizations. Azerbaijan's strongest diplomatic supporters are Turkey and Pakistan, which is the only UN member state not to have recognized Armenia's independence in support for Azerbaijan. Turkish-backed unrecognized Northern Cyprus (Turkish Cyprus) also supports Azerbaijan. The Organisation of Islamic Cooperation (OIC) and the Turkic Council have repeatedly  supported the Azerbaijani position. Some member states of these organizations, namely Uzbekistan and Saudi Arabia have voiced support for Azerbaijan's position on their own repeatedly. Lebanon, on the other hand, has not supported OIC's pro-Azerbaijani resolutions.

Azerbaijan has received diplomatic support, namely for its territorial integrity, from three post-Soviet states that have territorial disputes: Ukraine, Georgia, and Moldova. These three countries and Azerbaijan form the GUAM organization and support the Azerbaijani position in the format as well. Serbia, with its own territorial dispute over Kosovo, also explicitly supports Azerbaijan's territorial integrity.

Two other post-Soviet states, Kazakhstan and Belarus tacitly support Azerbaijan's position, especially within the Eurasian Economic Union (EEU) and the Collective Security Treaty Organization (CSTO), despite nominal alliance with Armenia.

Both Palestine and
Israel have voiced support for Azerbaijan.

2008 UN vote
On March 14, 2008, the United Nations General Assembly adopted a resolution which "reaffirmed Azerbaijan's territorial integrity, expressing support for that country's internationally recognized borders and demanding the immediate withdrawal of all Armenian forces from all occupied territories there." It was adopted by a vote of 39 in favor to 7 against, while most countries either abstained or were absent. It was backed mostly by Muslim states (31 were members of the OIC). Non-Muslim states that supported the resolution included three post-Soviet states: Georgia, Moldova, Ukraine, and five other nations: Cambodia, Colombia, Myanmar, Serbia, and Tuvalu. Thus, it was supported by seven OSCE members; one NATO member (Turkey) and no EU member state.

It was opposed by Angola, Armenia, France, India, Russia, United States, Vanuatu. The OSCE Minsk Group co-chair countries (France, US, Russia) voted against the resolution. They argued that it "selectively propagates only certain of [the basic] principles to the exclusion of others, without considering the Co-Chairs' proposal in its balanced entirety." The co-chair countries called it a unilateral resolution, which "threatens to undermine the peace process," but reaffirmed their "support for the territorial integrity of Azerbaijan, and thus do not recognize the independence of NK."

Ceasefire and international mediation 

A Russian-brokered ceasefire was signed in May 1994 and peace talks, mediated by the OSCE Minsk Group (Russia, US, France) have been held ever since by Armenia and Azerbaijan. Azerbaijan has repeatedly accused the Minsk Group (Russia, US, France) of being pro-Armenian. In 1996, when France was chosen by the OSCE to co-chair the Minsk Group, Azerbaijan asked the OSCE to reconsider the decision because France was perceived by Azerbaijan as pro-Armenian. Svante Cornell argued in 1997 that France, the US and Russia are "more or less biased towards Armenia in the conflict." In 2018 Azerbaijan accused the US and France of bias for allowing Bako Sahakyan, the then president of Artsakh, to visit their countries.

See also
 Armenia–Azerbaijan border
 List of ongoing armed conflicts

Notes

References

Bibliography
 
 
 
 
 

 
Armenia–Azerbaijan relations
1990s conflicts
2000s conflicts
2010s conflicts
1990s in Armenia
2000s in Armenia
2010s in Armenia
1990s in Azerbaijan
2000s in Azerbaijan
2010s in Azerbaijan
Wars involving Armenia
Military history of Armenia
Wars involving Azerbaijan
Military history of Azerbaijan
Post-Soviet conflicts
Conflicts in 2022
1990s in the Nagorno-Karabakh Republic
2000s in the Nagorno-Karabakh Republic
2010s in the Republic of Artsakh
Proxy wars
Military conflicts between Armenia and Azerbaijan